The Virgin Soldiers is a 1969 British war comedy-drama film directed by John Dexter and starring Lynn Redgrave, Hywel Bennett, Nigel Davenport, Nigel Patrick and Rachel Kempson. It is set in 1950, during the Malayan Emergency, and is based on the 1966 novel of the same name by Leslie Thomas.

The film's popularity spawned a 1977 sequel, Stand Up, Virgin Soldiers with Nigel Davenport repeating his role as Sgt Driscoll.

Premise
Private Brigg is a soldier sent to Singapore during the Malayan Emergency along with a squad of naïve new recruits. There he falls for Phillipa Raskin, the daughter of the regimental sergeant major.

Cast
 Lynn Redgrave as Phillipa Raskin
 Hywel Bennett as Pte Brigg
 Nigel Davenport as Sgt Driscoll
 Nigel Patrick as R.S.M. Raskin
 Rachel Kempson as Mrs. Raskin
 Jack Shepherd as Sgt Wellbeloved
 Michael Gwynn as Col Bromley-Pickering
 Tsai Chin as Juicy Lucy
 Christopher Timothy as Cpl Brook
 Don Hawkins as Tasker
 Geoffrey Hughes as Lantry
 Roy Holder as Fenwick
 Riggs O'Hara as Sinclair
 Gregory Phillips as Foster
 Peter Kelly as Sandy Jacobs
 Mark Nicholl as Cutler
 Alan Shatsman as Longley
 Jonty Miller as Forsyth
 Jolyon Jackley as Cpl Gravy Browning
 Robert Bridges as Sgt Fred Organ
 James Cosmo as Waller
 Graham Crowden as Medical Officer
 Dudley Jones as Doctor
 Matthew Guinness as Major Cusper
 Naranjan Singh as Sikh
 F Yew as 'Hallelujah'
 Brenda Bruce as Nursing Sister (uncredited)
 Warren Clarke as Soldier (uncredited)
 Barbara Keogh as WRAC (uncredited)
 James Marcus as Soldier (uncredited)
 Jeremy Roughton as Soldier (uncredited)

A young and uncredited David Bowie appears briefly as a soldier escorted out from behind a bar.

Reception
The Virgin Soldiers was the 17th-most-popular film at the U.K. box office in 1969.

References

External links
 
 The Virgin Soldiers at TCMDB
 The Virgin Soldiers film review at New York Times
 The Virgin Soldiers film review at Variety

1969 films
1960s war comedy-drama films
British war films
British Empire war films
Films set in Malaysia
Films based on British novels
Films set in 1950
British war comedy-drama films
Military humor in film
Films with screenplays by John Hopkins
Films with screenplays by Ian La Frenais
1969 comedy films
1969 drama films
Films scored by Peter Greenwell
Films about the Malayan Emergency
1960s English-language films
1960s British films
Films about the British Army